1996 was the 1st year of the Super 12 Tournament and the Waikato Chiefs rugby team. They won 6 of their 11 games and finished 6th overall on the table, but they didn't make the playoffs. The team was coached by Brad Meurant and captain by Richard Turner.

Standings

Results

Squad

The Chiefs squad for the 1996 Super 12 season were:

Player statistics

The Chiefs players' appearance and scoring statistics for the 1996 Super Rugby 12 are:

Notes and references

External links
Official Chiefs website
Official Super Rugby website 
Official Facebook page

1996
1996 in New Zealand rugby union
1996 Super 12 season by team